The earliest evidence of Hinduism in Tanzania is from the 1st millennium AD when there was trade between East Africa and Indian subcontinent. Most of these traders came from Gujarat, Deccan (now Maharashtra) and the Chola empire. Archaeological evidence of small Hindu settlements have been found in Zanzibar and parts of Swahili coast, Zimbabwe and Madagascar.

Pew Research Center estimates there were about 50,000 Hindus in Tanzania in 2010.

History
A mention of ancient trade between Hindus of India and Africa is from the time of Nabonidus, when Babylon was one of the hubs of global trade. In ancient times, the Hindus would trade, never interfere in political system and return to India. Small settlements of Hindus began in 1st century AD, mostly on islands east of Africa, along its coast and in few cases inland. Ancient Indian texts refer to Wanyamwezi, or "the men of the moon" - a term still in use to identify the Nyamwezi people in Tanzania. Every major explorer who visited eastern side of Africa has mentioned the presence of Hindu traders and merchants, in Zanzibar, Kilwa, Mombasa, Malindi and Mozambique. Vasco da Gama won over and convinced one such Africa-settled Gujarati Hindu to help pilot his maiden voyage from Africa to India. This affinity and regular trade was helped by steady trade winds that flow from east Africa to Indian peninsula for part of the year, while reverse and flow from Indian peninsula to east Africa for another part of the year.

The Hindus were known to be vegetarians and non-violent, never imposing their religion or culture in Africa. They prospered by offering a good trade, quality products and cash loans to the Zanzibar and other African community, but have traditionally kept their religion, social and cultural life as a private, personal matter. The first major change came to Tanzania with the arrival of Shia Islam (Ismaili), when Muslims and Omani Arabs began to compete with Indian Hindus, and when Muslims began a campaign of conversion. The second major change came with in 16th century with the arrival of colonial empires and Christianity.

During the colonial era, after European officials, Hindus were the most economically successful ethnic group in Tanzania, but they remained politically and legally insecure as a minority. When British colonial era ended, Indian Hindus became a targeted, persecuted group and many emigrated from Tanzania to Europe and India.

Hinduism in modern Tanzania

Hinduism is a minority religion in Tanzania, practiced by some 30,000 people (1996) in the mainland and Zanzibar combined. Most practitioners are of Indo-Tanzanian (particularly Gujarati) ancestry.

There were about 50,000 Hindus in Tanzania in 2010, according to Pew Research Center estimates.

Among the various traditions within Hinduism, Swaminarayan from Gujarat is an active bhakti school of Hinduism in Tanzania and Kenya. It was well established by 1950, because of its social, cultural and temple building initiatives in East Africa. Hindu temples have been established in Dar-es-Salaam, most of them located at the City Centre, the street name where the Hindu temples are located has been renamed to Pramukh Swami street. Swaminarayan temples have also been built in cities other than Dar-es-Salaam, such as Zanzibar, Arusha and Moshi. Other Hindu schools with presence in Tanzania include Yoga and Vedanta.

Followers of Brahma Kumari, Satya Sai Baba and Hare Krishna also have a presence amongst the Hindus in Tanzania.

Dipawali and other Hindu festivals are observed by the Hindus of Tanzania.

List of Hindu temples in Tanzania

Tanzania has Hindu temples in several cities and a Hindu council to help organize social and cultural activities.
BAPS Shri Swaminarayan Mandir, Arusha
Iskcon Arusha Centre, Arusha
Hindu Temple, Barongo road, Bukoba
Shri Swaminarayan Mandir, Morogoro road, Dar es Salaam
BAPS Shri Swaminarayan Mandir, Pramukh Swami street, Dar es Salaam
Shree Sanatan Dharma Sabha temple, Pramukh Swami street, Dar es Salaam
Shri Shankarashram temple, Pramukh Swami street, Dar es Salaam
Iskcon Dar es Salaam Centre, Mosque street, Dar es Salaam
Hindu Temple, Kilima Street, Moshi
Hindu Mandal Temple, Station Street, Morogoro
Shri Sanatan Dharma Mandir, Mwanza
BAPS Shri Swaminarayan Mandir, Mwanza
Shakti Temple, Zanzibar

References

External links
 Hinduism Today - "Hindus Stand Strong In Ancient Tanzania", February 1996
 Hindu Council, Tanzania